Darocasorex (named after the town Daroca in Spain, close to the place where its fossils were found) is an extinct shrew which existed in Europe during the Miocene epoch. It was first named by Jan A. van Dam in 2010.

References

Red-toothed shrews
Prehistoric Eulipotyphla
Miocene mammals of Europe
Fossil taxa described in 2010
Prehistoric placental genera